Cardoso, sometimes in the archaic spelling Cardozo, is a Portuguese, Galician and Latin surname. Notable people with the surname include:

 Anderson Sebastião Cardoso (born 1981), Brazilian central defender
 Gabriel Cardoso  (born 1985) is a United States Army Sergeant 
 Antonio Dias Cardoso (1933–2006), Angolan politician and writer
 Amadeo de Souza Cardoso (1887–1918), Portuguese painter
 Sidónio Bernardino Cardoso da Silva Pais (1872–1918), Portuguese politician and President (1918)
 Bill Cardoso (1937-2006), American journalist
 Bruno Cortez Cardoso (born 1984), Brazilian goalkeeper
 Carlos Cardoso (disambiguation), multiple people
 Celina Cardoso, last President and Secretary of the National Council of Cuban Scouting
 Daniel Cardoso (born 1981), Portuguese musician
 Elijah Aboab Cardoso, 17c philanthropist and founder of the Hamburg synagogue
 Elizete Cardoso (1920–1990), Brazilian singer and actress
 Esther Cardoso, Cuban film and theatre actress, produce, director and educator
 Fábio Cardoso (born 1994), Portuguese footballer
 Felippe Cardoso (born 1998), Brazilian footballer
 Fernando Henrique Cardoso (born 1930), President of Brazil 1995-2003 
 Guilherme Conceição Cardoso (born 1983), Brazilian defensive midfielder
 Inácio do Nascimento de Morais Cardoso (1811–1883), Portuguese cardinal
 Isaac Cardoso (died 1683), Jewish physician, philosopher, and polemic writer
 Jonatas Oliveira Cardoso (born 1983), Brazilian striker
 Jorge Cardoso (born 1949), Argentinian classical guitarist and composer
 José Cardoso Pires (1925–98), Portuguese author
 Jose Luis Cardoso (born 1975), Spanish motorcycle racer
 Laura Cardoso (born 1927), Brazilian actress
 Manuel Cardoso (composer) (1566–1650), Portuguese composer
 Marcel Silva Cardoso (born 1983), Brazilian left back
 Miguel Esteves Cardoso (born 1955), Portuguese writer, translator, critic and journalist
 Patricia Cardoso, Colombian-American film director
 Rodolfo Esteban Cardoso (born 1968), Argentine footballer and manager
 Rodolfo Tan Cardoso (1937–2013), Filipino chess player
 Rodrigo de Souza Cardoso (born 1982), Brazilian footballer
 Ruth Cardoso (1930–2008), Brazilian sociologist and author, wife of Fernando Henrique Cardoso
 Tiago Cardoso, Brazilian footballer
 Waldemar Levy Cardoso (1900-2009), Brazilian military officer
 Zélia Cardoso de Mello (born 1953), Brazilian economist, former Minister of Economy

Portuguese-language surnames
Galician-language surnames
Sephardic surnames